The 2028 UEFA European Football Championship, commonly referred to as UEFA Euro 2028 or simply Euro 2028, will be the 18th UEFA European Championship, the quadrennial international football championship organised by UEFA for the senior men's national teams of its member associations. 

The tournament is scheduled to be played from June to July 2028. The host, which will be either a shared bid from the United Kingdom and the Republic of Ireland, or Turkey, is expected to be chosen in September 2023.

Bid process

Countries must submit a bid with 10 stadiums, one of which must have 60,000 seats, one of which (preferably two) must have 50,000 seats, four of which must have 40,000 seats and three of which must have 30,000 seats.

Bidding timeline
On 16 December 2021, the UEFA Executive Committee announced the bidding process would be held in parallel with that of UEFA Euro 2032. Interested bidders can bid for either one of the tournaments. The bidding timeline is as follows:

27 September 2021: Applications formally invited
23 March 2022: Closing date for registering intention to bid
30 March 2022: Bid requirements made available to bidders
5 April 2022: Announcement of bidders
28 April 2022: Opening workshop for bidders
16 November 2022: Submission of preliminary bid dossier
12 April 2023: Submission of final bid dossier
September 2023: Bid presentation and announcement of host

Confirmed bids
Three declarations of interest to host the tournament (one later deemed ineligible) were received by UEFA before the deadline of 23 March 2022.

England previously hosted the tournament in 1996, and twelve matches of the multi-national Euro 2020 were played in London and Glasgow.
 – On 23 March, the Turkish Football Federation confirmed it had submitted an application to host Euro 2028.

Rejected bids
 – Also on 23 March, Russia announced its bid, despite the current bans by UEFA on the participation of Russian clubs and the Russian national team due to their country's invasion of Ukraine. On 2 May, UEFA declared the 2028 and 2032 bids as ineligible.

Qualification 
The host(s) will have qualified for the tournament automatically. At least 19 and up to 23 remaining spots will be determined by a qualifying tournament.

A revised qualification format was confirmed by the UEFA Executive Committee during their meeting in Nyon, Switzerland, on 25 January 2023. The qualification format was modified from the previous cycle. The qualifying group stage will feature twelve groups of four or five teams. The winner of each group will qualify for the European Championship, while the second-placed teams will either qualify directly or participate in play-off matches.

Broadcasting rights 
  VRT, RTBF
  NOVA
  ERT
  Rai Sport
  TVP
  PRO TV
  RTS
  Markíza
  BBC, ITV
  Fox Sports
  Optus Sport
  Spark Sport
  TVA Sports

References

 
2028
Scheduled association football competitions
2028 in association football